Ng Shu Wai (born 27 May 1985) is a Malaysian gymnast. He competed at the 2004 Summer Olympics.

References

External links
 

1985 births
Living people
Malaysian male artistic gymnasts
Olympic gymnasts of Malaysia
Gymnasts at the 2004 Summer Olympics
People from Perak
Commonwealth Games medallists in gymnastics
Commonwealth Games silver medallists for Malaysia
Asian Games medalists in gymnastics
Asian Games silver medalists for Malaysia
Gymnasts at the 2002 Asian Games
Gymnasts at the 2006 Asian Games
Medalists at the 2006 Asian Games
Gymnasts at the 2002 Commonwealth Games
Gymnasts at the 2006 Commonwealth Games
21st-century Malaysian people
Medallists at the 2006 Commonwealth Games